Xylocopa tranquebarica, or Xylocopa (Nyctomelitta) tranquibarica, is a species of carpenter bee. It is found only in South Asian and Southeast Asian countries. It is a nocturnal bee.

References 

 http://animaldiversity.org/accounts/Xylocopa_tranquebarica/classification/
 https://www.itis.gov/servlet/SingleRpt/SingleRpt?search_topic=TSN&search_value=766920
 https://www.uniprot.org/uniprot/Q9GS73

Further reading 

Ruggiero M. (project leader), Ascher J. et al. (2013). ITIS Bees: World Bee Checklist (version Sep 2009). In: Species 2000 & ITIS Catalogue of Life, 11 March 2013 (Roskov Y., Kunze T., Paglinawan L., Orrell T., Nicolson D., Culham A., Bailly N., Kirk P., Bourgoin T., Baillargeon G., Hernandez F., De Wever A., eds). Digital resource at www.catalogueoflife.org/col/. Species 2000: Reading, UK.
John Ascher, Connal Eardley, Terry Griswold, Gabriel Melo, Andrew Polaszek, Michael Ruggiero, Paul Williams, Ken Walker, and Natapot Warrit.

tranquebarica
Fauna of South Asia
Fauna of Southeast Asia
Insects described in 1804